Choe Buk (fl. 1755–85), was a Korean painter of the late Joseon period. He used many pen names, Samgijae, Hosaenggwan, Songjae, Giam, Geogijae among them.

Life

His childhood remains unknown, as well as the social status of his family. The Grove says 'floruit c. 1755–85'.  Nevertheless, the Korean wiki page :ko:최북 says: 최북(崔北, 1712년 – 1760년)은 조선 숙종, 영조 때의 화가이다 ... and gives a reference to AKS  ... that explains why 1720 can be guessed as his birth year.

It seems that, despite the fame of Choe Buk in Seoul, his excessive drinking left him perpetually short of cash, and he resorted to making trips to other cities to sell his works. He may have died in Seoul, but the year remains unrecorded.

He was known as a skilled landscape painter, but also drew portraits, flowers and animals. Legend tells of a powerful aristocrat that forced him to draw, but Choe refused to do so and as a result had one eye pierced, leading to the loss sight in that eye.

He was known to have traveled in Japan and was known to Zheng Zhilong's family; painting an image of Zheng's wife and their son Koxinga. The original returned to Korea with Choe, but a copy was kept with the family and was later emulated by Bak Jega.

Style and Galleries

Choe Buk was acquainted with Kim Hong-do, Kim Deuk-sin, Yi In-mun, but his works are dissimilar to theirs.

The Korean Copyright Commission  lists 20 paintings for Choe Buk, while Towooart  gives a short notice.

See also
Korean painting
List of Korean painters

References

Bibliography

External links
Arts of Korea, an exhibition catalog from The Metropolitan Museum of Art Libraries (fully available online as PDF), which contains material on Choe Buk

18th-century Korean painters
Gyeongju Choe clan
Year of death unknown
Year of birth unknown